Paddy Leahy (16 May 1874 – 6 May 1955) was an Australian rules footballer who played with Geelong and Carlton in the Victorian Football League (VFL).

Notes

External links 

 
Paddy Leahy's profile at Blueseum

1874 births
1955 deaths
Australian rules footballers from Victoria (Australia)
Geelong Football Club (VFA) players
Geelong Football Club players
Carlton Football Club players